Konkin (Russian: Конкин) is a Russian masculine surname originating from the Greek given name Conon, its feminine counterpart is Konkina. The surname may refer to the following notable people:
Anastasia Konkina (born 1993), Russian judoka
Anna Konkina (born 1947), Russian cyclist
Ksenia Konkina (born 2001), Russian ice dancer.
Samuel Edward Konkin III (1947–2004), American libertarian philosopher
Vladimir Konkin (born 1951), Soviet/Russian cinema and theatre actor

References

Russian-language surnames